The England national football team represents England in association football and is controlled by The Football Association. It is the joint-oldest national football team in the world, alongside Scotland, England's opponents in what is now recognised as the world's first international football match, which took place at Hamilton Crescent in Glasgow in November 1872. Prior to this, a series of matches had been played between teams representing the two countries, but the Scottish team was drawn almost entirely from players based in and around London and these games are now not regarded as full international matches.

Between 1872 and 1899, which was the end of the 19th century, England played in 61 matches, resulting in 37 wins, 9 draws and 15 defeats. During this time England played annual friendly against Scotland each year until 1883, and added a regular game against Wales in 1879. These two teams remained England's only opponents until the British Home Championship was instituted in 1884, consisting of a round-robin tournament between England, Scotland, Wales and Ireland. Of the 15 tournaments staged prior to the 20th century, England won 7 outright and 2 jointly with Scotland.

1870s

1872

1873

1874

1875

1876

1877

1878

1879

1880s

1880

1881

1882

1883

1884

1885

1886

1887

1888

1889

1890s

1890

1891

1892

1893

1894

1895

1896

1897

1898

1899

References 

1870s in England
1880s in England
1890s in England
1872-99